

Geography
Akilabad Village is located at

Village profile
State : bihar
District :vaishali district
Sub-district:hajipur

Area details
Area of village (in hectares) : 68 
Number of households : 297

Population

Total population : 2,264
Total male population : 1,222
Total female  population : 1,042
Scheduled castes population(total) :255
Scheduled castes male : 139
Scheduled castes Females : 116

Education facilities
Number of primary schools : 01
Middle school available within range: Within 5 km
college available within range: Within 5 km

Medical facilities
Allopathic hospitals available within range : Within 5 km
Maternity and child welfare centre available within range : Within 5 km
Primary health centre available
within range : Between 5 km and 10 km

Post, telegraph and telephone facilities
Post, telegraph and phone facilities : available
Post office available within
range : Within 5 km

Number of telephone connections : 04

Transportation

Bus services available within range : Within 5 km
Railway service available within
range : Between 5 km and 10 km

Navigable water way available
within range : Within 5 km

Banking facilities
Commercial bank Available within range : Within 5 km

Co-operative bank available within
range : Within 5 km

Recreational and cultural facilities 

Cinema / video-hall available within range : Within 5 km
Sports club available range : Within 5 km
Stadium /auditorium available within range : Within 5 km

Approach to villages
Nearest town : Hajipur
Distance from the nearest town( in km) : 5 km

Power supply
Power supply facilities : available
Electricity for domestic use : 01

News paper/magazine
News paper/magazine facilities : available
Newspaper :available
Magazine :available

Land use Two decimal in hectares 
Total irrigated area : 38.46
others : 38.46
Unirrigated area: 20.71
Culturable waste (including gauchar and groves) : 0.86
Area not available for cultivation : 8.45

References

Villages in Vaishali district
Hajipur